Lunsford Richardson Preyer (January 11, 1919 – April 3, 2001) was a United States district judge of the United States District Court for the Middle District of North Carolina and later a United States representative from North Carolina.

Education and career

Born in Greensboro, Guilford County, North Carolina, Preyer graduated from Woodberry Forest School in Woodberry Forest, Virginia. He received an A.B. in English from Princeton University in 1941 after completing a senior thesis titled "The Contrasting Values of Dickens and Daudet." At Princeton he was on the 150 lb. football team and the golf team and was vice-president of Princeton Tower Club. He received a Bachelor of Laws from Harvard Law School in 1949. He was in the United States Navy from 1941 to 1946, serving as gunnery officer and executive officer on destroyers in both the Atlantic and Pacific. He received a Bronze Star for action at Okinawa. He was in private practice of law in New York City, New York from 1949 to 1950. He worked for Vick Chemical Company in 1950 (founded by his grandfather and namesake Lunsford Richardson). He was in private practice of law in Greensboro from 1951 to 1956. He was a City Judge from 1953 to 1954. He was a Judge of the North Carolina Superior Court from 1956 to 1961.

Federal judicial service

Preyer received a recess appointment from President John F. Kennedy on October 7, 1961, to the United States District Court for the Middle District of North Carolina, to a new seat created by 75 Stat. 80. He was nominated to the same seat by President Kennedy on January 15, 1962. He was confirmed by the United States Senate on February 7, 1962, and received his commission on February 17, 1962. His service was terminated on October 9, 1963, due to his resignation.

Unsuccessful run for governor and return to private service

Preyer was an unsuccessful candidate for Governor of North Carolina in 1964. He was Senior Vice President and Trust Officer of North Carolina National Bank (now Bank of America) from 1965 to 1968.

Congressional service

Preyer was elected as a Democratic United States Representative from North Carolina to the 91st United States Congress and to the five succeeding Congresses, serving from January 3, 1969, to January 3, 1981. He was Chairman of the House Ethics Committee in the 95th Congress. He was an unsuccessful candidate for reelection to the 97th Congress in 1980.

Post congressional service and death

In 1988, Preyer was elected to the Common Cause National Governing Board. Preyer resided in Greensboro until his death of cancer on April 3, 2001, in that city. He is interred in Green Hill Cemetery in Greensboro.

Honors

The L. Richardson Preyer Federal Building in Greensboro is named in Preyer's honor. Preyer and his wife, Emily, both received the North Carolina Award for Public Service.

Family and relations

Preyer was the grandson of inventor Lunsford Richardson. His parents were William Yost Preyer (June 4, 1888 Ohio – 1970) and Mary Norris Richardson (1889 – 1969) daughter of Lunsford Richardson (1854 – 1919) and Mary Lynn Smith (1858 – 1940). He was married to Emily Irving Harris (1919 – 1999).

See also
 List of members of the House Un-American Activities Committee

References

Sources
 Civil Rights Greensboro: Lunsford Richardson Preyer
 The Political Graveyard
 
 
 
 October 10, 2001 Memorials in Princeton Alumni Weekly
 North Carolina General Assembly resolution (rich text file)
 UNC giving - The L. Richardson and Emily Preyer bicentennial professorship

1919 births
2001 deaths
20th-century American judges
20th-century American politicians
United States Navy personnel of World War II
Bank of America executives
Burials in North Carolina
Deaths from cancer in North Carolina
Democratic Party members of the United States House of Representatives from North Carolina
Harvard Law School alumni
Judges of the United States District Court for the Middle District of North Carolina
North Carolina state court judges
Politicians from Greensboro, North Carolina
Princeton University alumni
United States district court judges appointed by John F. Kennedy
Woodberry Forest School alumni